The New Zealand five-cent coin was the lowest denomination coin of the New Zealand dollar from 1990 to 2006. The five-cent coin was introduced when the New Zealand dollar was introduced on 10 July 1967, replacing the New Zealand sixpence coin. On 31 July 2006 it was eliminated as part of a revision of New Zealand's coins, and it was demonetised (no longer legal tender) as of 1 November 2006.

History
The five-cent coin was introduced on 10 July 1967 with the decimalisation of New Zealand currency, where the New Zealand dollar replaced the New Zealand pound at a rate of two dollars to a pound, with six pence in the old pound currency equaling five cents in the new one. The new five cent coin was the same size and composition as the old sixpence coin it replaced to ease the transition. The coin was made of cupronickel, 19.43 mm in diameter, and weighed 2.83 grams.

By the early 2000s, the five-cent coin had become of little value due to inflation. The coin was subsequently demonetised effective 1 November 2006.

Counting proofs and coins in mint sets, a total of 617,508,200 (618 million) coins of the denomination were minted during its existence, a total value of $30,875,410.00

In 2017, American author John Green requested that some of the coins be given to him to give away as gifts on his upcoming book tour. He put out a video about the experience in November 2017.

See also
 Coins of the New Zealand dollar

References

05
Five-cent coins
2006 disestablishments in New Zealand
1967 establishments in New Zealand